Vilniansk is a city in Zaporizhzhia Oblast, Ukraine and the administrative center of Vilniansk Rayon. Population: .

Gallery

References

Cities in Zaporizhzhia Oblast
Cities of district significance in Ukraine
Populated places established in the Russian Empire